Escalante is a municipality located in the autonomous community of Cantabria, Spain. According to the 2007 census, the city has a population of 749 inhabitants.

See also
 Bernardino de Escalante (who was from the nearby Laredo, Cantabria)
 Diego de Guevara, son of the Lord of Escalante, courtier and art collector

References

External links
Escalante - Cantabria 102 Municipios

Municipalities in Cantabria